3563 Canterbury, provisional designation , is a dark Dorian asteroid from the middle regions of the asteroid belt, approximately 16 kilometers in diameter. It was discovered on 23 March 1985, by astronomer couple Alan Gilmore and Pamela Kilmartin at Mount John University Observatory near Lake Tekapo, New Zealand. The asteroid was named after New Zealand's Canterbury Province.

Classification and orbit

Dora family 

Canterbury is a member of the Dora family, a large asteroid family of more than 1,200 carbonaceous asteroids, named after 668 Dora. It is also known as the "Zhongolovich family", named after its presumably largest member 1734 Zhongolovich. The Dora family may also contain a subfamily.

Orbit and observation arc 

Canterbury orbits the Sun in the central main-belt at a distance of 2.3–3.3 AU once every 4 years and 8 months (1,703 days). Its orbit has an eccentricity of 0.18 and an inclination of 7° with respect to the ecliptic.

Physical characteristics 

Canterbury has been characterized as a dark C-type asteroid by Pan-STARRS photometric survey. It is also classified as a hydrated Ch-subtype in the SMASS taxonomy.

Rotation period 

In October 2010, a rotational lightcurve of Canterbury was obtained from photometric observations by astronomers at the Palomar Transient Factory in California. Lightcurve analysis gave a rotation period of 15.553 hours with a brightness variation of 0.61 magnitude.

Diameter and albedo 

According to the survey carried out by the NEOWISE mission of NASA's Wide-field Infrared Survey Explorer, Canterbury measures between 15.26 and 21.08 kilometers in diameter and its surface has an albedo between 0.040 and 0.060. The Collaborative Asteroid Lightcurve Link assumes a standard albedo for carbonaceous asteroids of 0.057 and calculates a diameter of 13.72 kilometers based on an absolute magnitude of 13.04.

Naming 

This minor planet was named after New Zealand's Canterbury Province, on the eastern side of the South Island. It is also named for the University of Canterbury in Christchurch, New Zealand. The approved naming citation was published by the Minor Planet Center on 28 May 1991.

References

External links 
 Pam Kilmartin, University of Canterbury
 Alan Gilmore, University of Canterbury
 Asteroid Lightcurve Database (LCDB), query form (info )
 Dictionary of Minor Planet Names, Google books
 Asteroids and comets rotation curves, CdR – Observatoire de Genève, Raoul Behrend
 Discovery Circumstances: Numbered Minor Planets (1)-(5000) – Minor Planet Center
 
 

003563
Discoveries by Alan C. Gilmore
Discoveries by Pamela M. Kilmartin
Named minor planets
003563
19850323